A grimalkin (or greymalkin) is an old or evil-looking female cat.

Grimalkin may also refer to:

 The Grimalkin, the 2006 album by Noekk
 SV Grimalkin, a yacht that competed but failed to finish in the 1979 Fastnet race
 Grimalkin, a character in The Wardstone Chronicles
 "Grimalkin", a poem by Thomas Lynch
 Grimalkin, the 1811 winner of the Doncaster Cup horse race
 Grimalkin, a comic strip by Louis Wain
 Grimalkin, a cat in the book "King of the Wind" by Marguerite Henry (1948)
 The Grimalkin is a malk in The Dresden Files; a species of feline fae allied with the Winter court, about the size of a bobcat, but stronger, faster and smarter than most humans. 

Graymalkin may refer to:
 the familiar, presumably a cat, of one of the three witches in Shakespeare's Macbeth
 Graymalkin, a fictional character in the X-Men series of comics
 Graymalkin Industries, a front for X-Men activities in comics
 Graymalkin, a space station dismantled and used as material for the island of Providence in Marvel comics
 Graymalkin, a demonic cat in the 1957 British film Curse of the Demon